Autauga County School System, based in Autauga County, Alabama, has 13 schools and over 9,900 students as of 2007.

The schools are located in the communities of Billingsley, Pine Level, and Marbury, and the cities of Autaugaville and Prattville.

The district includes the Autauga County portions of Prattville and Millbrook.

Schools
Autaugaville
Autaugaville School Enrollment 521 (Grades K-12)
Deatsville
Marbury High School Enrollment 705 (Grades 9–12)
Pine Level
Pine Level Elementary  Enrollment 1,192 (Grades K-5)
Marbury
Marbury Middle School Enrollment 502 (Grades 6–8)
Billingsley
Billingsley School Enrollment 749 (Grades K-12)
Prattville
Autauga County Technology Center
Daniel Pratt Elementary School (Grades 1–6)
Prattville Kindergarten School (Grades Pre-K and Kindergarten)
Prattville Primary School (Grades 1–2)
Prattville Elementary School (Grades 3–4)
Prattville Intermediate School (Grades 5–6)
Prattville Junior High School (Grades 7–8)
Prattville High School (Grades 9–12)

References

External links
 Autauga County School System

School districts in Alabama
School System